Asimakis "Simos" Krassas (born July 10, 1982 in Athens, Greece) is a Cypriot football midfielder.

Career
Krassas made his first football steps in AEL Limassol's Academy where served for many years as captain. In 2004, he moved to Greece to join AEK Athens. He stayed there for 2 and a half years where he played for Panionios and Apollon Kalamarias. When he returned to Cyprus he went back to AEL before playing Alki Larnaca and Aris Limassol.

External links
 

1982 births
Living people
Cypriot footballers
Cyprus international footballers
Greek people of Cypriot descent
Greek expatriate footballers
Association football midfielders
AEL Limassol players
Super League Greece players
AEK Athens F.C. players
Panionios F.C. players
Apollon Pontou FC players
Alki Larnaca FC players
Aris Limassol FC players
Cypriot First Division players
Expatriate footballers in Greece
Footballers from Athens
Greek footballers